Elections to the Volksraad were held in the Dutch East Indies on 16 October 1917. The result was a victory for the Dutch Indies Freethinkers Association, who defeated the Protestant Christian Ethical Party and the Catholic Indian Catholic Party.

Background
The Volksraad was created by a law passed on 16 December 1916 in order to further the possibility of self-government. It had a total of 38 members, half of which were to be elected and half appointed. Seats were also assigned to ethnic groups, with 20 for the Dutch population (nine elected, eleven appointed), 15 for the native population (ten elected, five appointed) and three for the Chinese population (all of which were appointed).

Results

Volksraad members
The subsequent membership of the Volksraad included:

References

1917 elections in Asia
1917
1917 in the Dutch East Indies